Trilophidia is a genus of grasshoppers in the family Acrididae, subfamily Oedipodinae and the only member of the tribe Trilophidiini. The recorded distribution of species is from Africa and the middle-East through to Japan and Malesia.

Species
The Orthoptera Species File and Catalogue of Life list:
Trilophidia annulata Thunberg, 1815 - type species (as Oedipoda cristella Stål; synonym T. japonica Saussure, 1888)
Trilophidia burtti Hollis, 1965
Trilophidia cinnabarina Brancsik, 1893
Trilophidia conturbata Walker, 1870
Trilophidia namibica La Greca, 1991
Trilophidia parvula Popov, 1985
Trilophidia repleta Walker, 1870
 Trilophidia turpis (Walker, 1870)

Gallery

References

Acrididae genera
Invertebrates of Southeast Asia